Hermine Agavni Kalustyan (1914 – September 3, 1989) was an Armenian–Turkish mathematician, educator, and politician.

Kalustyan was born in 1914 in Istanbul. She graduated from Paris High School Teacher Training School and from Istanbul University Mathematics Department. In 1941, she wrote her dissertation titled "Conformal depiction and the movement of an object" in the Istanbul University under Richard von Mises and William Prager. Between 1948 and 1973, Kalustyan was appointed principal at Esayan Armenian High School, and taught mathematics at the Galatasaray High School in Istanbul, Turkey. In 1961, she became the republic's first non-Muslim minority woman to serve in parliament with her appointment to the transitional parliament (1960–1961) that constructed the 1961 Constitution. In 1975, she published an Armenian book titled, "Towards the Past and Now: Towards Fezaya".

References 

1914 births
1989 deaths
Turkish people of Armenian descent
Turkish mathematicians
Women mathematicians
Istanbul University alumni